The Night Digger is a 1971 British thriller film based on the novel Nest in a Fallen Tree by Joy Cowley about two women who are visited by a suspicious handy man. It was adapted by Roald Dahl and starred his then wife Patricia Neal. The Night Digger was the American title; it was originally released in the United Kingdom as The Road Builder.

Plot
Maura Prince (Patricia Neal) works part-time as a speech therapist and the rest of her time taking care of her blind, invalid mother, Edith (Pamela Brown). Billy Jarvis (Nicholas Clay) arrives, claiming he was sent there by a neighbor's nephew. He ingratiates himself with Edith, who puts him in Maura's bedroom and claims he must be a long-lost relative. Despite Maura's worries, Billy turns out to be a good worker.

While attending church with Edith, Billy notices pretty, young nursery school teacher Mary Wingate (Diana Patrick). That night, while having psychotic flashbacks of young girls tormenting him for impotency, Billy goes to her home and murders her, then buries her body at a construction site. She is the seventh victim he's killed. A nurse (Brigit Forsyth) visits Edith, and warns that Edith's heart is very bad. Having more psychotic visions, Billy follows the nurse home and murders her as well.

Edith calls out for Billy. When he doesn't answer, she tries to climb the stairs to his room and has a heart attack. Maura rushes her to the hospital. When Maura returns from the hospital, she almost catches Billy coming home from the murder. To placate her, Billy lies, claiming his mother died in a fire. He weeps, claiming he often doesn't know what he is doing, and begs Maura to never betray him.

The next day, Maura visits Edith at the hospital. Edith demands that Maura throw Billy out, but Maura breaks with Edith instead.

Maura takes all her savings, buys a new wardrobe, and returns home to tell Billy that she loves him. The two run off to Scotland, where Maura purchases a farm. After some months, Billy meets a young woman who is looking for her dog. Hours later, Billy returns to the farm, psychotic. Maura realizes he has killed again. Realizing he's broken Maura's heart, Billy drives off a cliff on his motorcycle, committing suicide.

Cast
 Patricia Neal as Maura Prince 
 Pamela Brown as Mrs. Edith Prince 
 Nicholas Clay as Billy Jarvis 
 Jean Anderson as Mrs. Millicent McMurtrey 
 Graham Crowden as Mr. Bolton 
 Yootha Joyce as Mrs. Palafox 
 Peter Sallis as Reverend Rupert Palafox 
 Brigit Forsyth as District Nurse 
 Sebastian Breaks as Dr. Ronnie Robinson 
 Christopher Reynalds as Young Billy
 Sibylla Kay as Whore

Critical reception
In a contemporary review, The New York Times wrote "It begs for empathy for its tortured principals, but despite the clearly dedicated contributions of Patricia Neal, Roald Dahl, her scenarist-husband; Pamela Brown and a young newcomer, Nicholas Clay, the strain on credibility is a good deal more notable than the impact on the emotions"; while more recently, a reviewer for DVD Talk wrote "The Night Digger doesn't carry much of a reputation, but I found it highly unusual, and more than satisfying". Cinema Retro called it "an underrated gem"; and the Radio Times concluded "director Alastair Reid's neo-Grand Guignol chamber piece exudes a peculiar fascination".

References

Further reading

External links 
 

1971 films
British thriller films
Films based on New Zealand novels
Films with screenplays by Roald Dahl
Films scored by Bernard Herrmann
Films directed by Alastair Reid
Metro-Goldwyn-Mayer films
1970s thriller films
Films set in country houses
Films set in London
1970s English-language films
1970s British films